is a small peninsula town located in Nishiuwa District, Ehime Prefecture, Japan. , the town had an estimated population of 8,497 in 15638 households and a population density of 90 persons per km². The total area of the town is 

Following a recent merger with the neighboring towns of Misaki and Seto, the town now spans the mountainous Sadamisaki Peninsula, the narrowest peninsula in Japan and the westernmost point on the island of Shikoku.

This unique geography has greatly influenced Ikata's growth. On the one hand, it has presented significant challenges to urban development that were not overcome until recently in the town's long history. On the other, the peninsula is what gives the town its beautiful mountain and ocean scenery which, bolstered by significant investments in infrastructure and tourist facilities, has formed the basis for a burgeoning tourism industry.

In addition to the beauty of its rugged, natural landscape, Ikata has long been known for fishing and mikan orange farming. In recent years Ikata has also become a hotspot of modern energy production—the Ikata Nuclear Power Plant produced much of Shikoku's electricity until it was shut down in 2012 following the 2011 Tōhoku earthquake and tsunami (before being reactivated in 2018), and the town's windy mountains are dotted by dozens of windmills.

Geography

Ikata is on the Sadamisaki Peninsula, Japan's narrowest peninsula and the westernmost point on the island of Shikoku. The peninsula is extremely mountainous, with steep cliffs and precious little usable flat land. To combat this, the town's bays and ponds have seen vigorous coastal reclamation efforts dating back to the early Meiji period (late 1800s).  Ikata's mountainsides are covered with terraced mikan fields, and natural forest in the undeveloped areas.

The various neighborhoods of Ikata are found nestled among the foothills of the mountains, connected only by winding coastal roads and a single highway, Route 197. The biggest of the neighborhoods and the administrative center of Ikata is Minatoura, near the eastern edge of the town.

Ikata is surrounded on three sides by ocean—the Iyo Sea (part of the Inland Sea) to the north, the Uwa Sea (Pacific Ocean) to the south, and the Hōyo Strait (separating Shikoku from Kyūshū) to the west.

Neighbouring municipalities 
Ehime Prefecture
Yawatahama

Climate
The coldest parts of winter remain above freezing (5 °C or 41 °F on average), with snowfall seen only once or twice per year. Rain is concentrated in the rainy season in June and July, and also in September.

The length of the peninsula makes accurate weather prediction difficult for the town; when driving down Melody Line, it is not uncommon to find it sunny between one set of tunnels, rainy between another, and foggy between yet another. Ikata's position, stretching out into the ocean, also makes it a frequent target for typhoons.

Demographics

Ikata is a small town, with a population of 10,637 as of March 31, 2014. The total land area of the town is 94.37 km2, making the population density 113 persons per km2. However, much of the land on the peninsula is quite mountainous and not suited for development; the population density of the individual settlements, which are squeezed into the small bay areas in the foothills of the mountains, is much higher. Extrapolating from data based on the most recent land survey, only 3.21% of the town's land is inhabited; this puts the population density at a much higher 3,510 persons/kilometer-squared.

Like much of rural Japan, Ikata faces a rapidly declining and aging population. According to the Ikata website, roughly 40% of the town's population is 65 or older.  Furthermore, many elementary and middle schools have closed since the 1970s. Those that remain have very small student populations. For example, Ikata Elementary School is Ikata's largest elementary school; there were 303 students in 1987, 162 in 2006, and 128 in 2014; Toyonoura Elementary was Old Ikata's smallest school; it had 51 students in 1987, and only 14 in 2007. before it closed in 2010. Currently, Futami Elementary is Ikata's smallest Elementary school with 21 students. However, plans are in effect to close the school at the end of the current fiscal year (April, 2015).

This population issue was a significant part of the impetus for the recent merger of Old Ikata with Seto and Misaki. While Old Ikata is geographically more accessible, and has enjoyed the economic benefits of the Ikata Nuclear Power Plant, Seto and Misaki have experienced even more severe aging and decline of their populations. In 2000, Seto's working-age population dipped below 50% of its total.

Ethnically Ikata is extremely homogeneous with only a handful of non-Japanese residents, most of whom are either temporary farm laborers from China, or English educators on the JET Programme.

Per Japanese census data, the population of Ikata has been decreasing steadily since the 1950s, and is now less than third of what it was a century ago.

History

Prehistory
The Sadamisaki Peninsula area has been inhabited since at least the Jōmon period (10,000–300 BC), as evidenced by the discovery of stone tools and earthenware pots in the Misaki and Kushi neighborhoods.

In 1963 a local man discovered a stone ax dating to the mid-Yayoi period (300 BC–250 AD) in his farm plot in the Kawachi neighborhood. This is a type of settlement usually located several tens of meters above the surrounding area on mountainsides, and is peculiar to the Yayoi period.

Classical era
After the Taika Reform of 646, Ikata and the greater surrounding area became known as the Uwa District in 701. The Uwa District covered the entire Nanyo region (map) until it was split in two in 866. Since districts were defined by population, one can infer that the area was underdeveloped and sparsely populated at the time.

Feudal era

As ownership of farmlands became increasingly concentrated in the hands of local ruling families, control of the Yano area was given to Taira no Tadamitsu, a member of the Heike clan.

Some members of the Heike family secretly settled in the Seto area in 1185 after being defeated in the Genpei Wars.

From 1610 to 1612, the first Uwajima feudal lord, Tomita Nobutaka, gathered farmers from the local area to dig a canal through the thinnest part of the Sadamisaki Peninsula, Seto's Mitsukue neighborhood. The project was soon canceled due to insufficient funds. By this time, the name  can be seen in records of taxes paid to the feudal lords.The Mitsukue neighborhood prospered as a port town during the feudal period, as it was used as a port of rest for daimyō on their way to and from the capital as part of the sankin-kōtai system. This traffic was likely the source of the demand for Nobutaka's abortive attempt to create a shortcut through the peninsula.

Modern era

A decade after the Meiji Restoration, in March 1878 the Uwa District was divided into the current Kitauwa, Minamiuwa, Higashiuwa, and Nishiuwa districts (North-, South-, East-, and West-Uwa, respectively).

More recently, Seto's Mitsukue Bay was used for submarine training operations by the Imperial Japanese Navy leading up to World War II, as the bay's shape is similar to that of Pearl Harbor. A monument named  stands in Suka Park in Mitsukue as a memorial dedicated to the nine young men (ages 21–28) who were stationed in the Mitsukue area for these exercises. According to the plaque on the monument, the men were quite friendly with the locals, and stories are still told about them in the neighborhood to this day. The men died on December 8, 1941, during one of the initial attacks on Pearl Harbor.

In 1955 another round of mergers corresponding to the Great Shōwa Merger reduced the number of municipal entities to three.

In 1977 the Ikata Nuclear Power Plant began operation as the first nuclear power plant on the island of Shikoku.

On April 1, 2005, Ikata merged with the nearby towns of Misaki and Seto to create the new town of Ikata, which spans the Sadamisaki Peninsula.

Current events
March, 2014. National attention turns to Ikata as the towns elections near. Many wonder if Ikata will approve the restart of its nuclear power generators.

The installation of many new windmills in 2006 and 2007 solicited a significant amount of noise complaints from nearby residents.

Timeline
March 1878 — Meiji reforms create the Nishiuwa District
1889 — Ikata is designated a village.
March 31, 1955 — The villages of Ikata and Machimi merge, forming the old town of Ikata
September 30, 1977 — Reactor No. 1 of the Ikata Nuclear Power Plant begins operation
April 1, 2005 — The towns of Misaki and Seto were merged into Ikata to form the new and expanded town of Ikata

Government and politics
Ikata has a mayor-council form of government with a directly elected mayor and a unicameral city council of 13 members. Ikata together with Yawatahama, contributes two members to the Ehime Prefectural Assembly. In terms of national politics, the town is part of Ehime 4th district  of the lower house of the Diet of Japan.

Ikata experienced significant political turbulence leading up to and immediately following the April 1, 2005 merger with Seto and Misaki. To begin with, multiple potential merger plans were put forth, one of which was for all of the contiguous Nishiuwa District towns (Misaki, Seto, Old Ikata, and Honai) to merge. However, when Honai announced that it would merge with the nearby city of Yawatahama, polls indicated that Misaki residents still preferred to merge with Honai and Yawatahama, rather than Seto and Old Ikata, despite their being discontiguous (a Misaki-Honai-Yawatahama merger would make Misaki an exclave). Ultimately this was found to be impractical, and the Misaki-Seto-Ikata merger was approved with some grumbling over the naming of the new town. Once the merger was decided upon, suggestions for the new town's name were solicited from the residents. Despite the many other reasonable suggestions and the seeming unfairness toward Seto and Misaki, the "new" name was chosen to be "Ikata."

Following the merger a heated mayoral race was held, with 11 members of incumbent Kiyoyoshi Nakamoto's campaign arrested for electoral fraud. Challenger Yoshihisa Hatanaka ultimately won, only to be arrested in February 2006 for corruption relating to government construction contracts. He resigned soon thereafter. A second race was held in April 2006, with Kazuhiko Yamashita defeating rival Kiyohiko Takakado by only 90 votes. Voter turnout was 87.43%.

There has been and remains political resistance among some Ikata residents to the nuclear power plant.

The most recent mayoral election took place on April 13, 2014 which found incumbent Yamashita in seat for his third term as mayor. 85.33% of the total 9,190 eligible voters turning out to cast a ballot. Mr. Yamashita garnered a total of 3,266 of the electorate while a certain Mr. Yoshihisa Hatanaka (see above) came in second place with a total of 2,399 votes. A non-Ikata resident of the "People Who Don't Need Nukes" Party (原発いらない人々) managed to win slightly more than 1% of the electorate with 104 votes.

Economy
Ikata's main industries are farming (largely citrus fruits such as mikans), fishing, and electrical power. Ikata produces a substantial fraction of Shikoku's electricity. There are two main power production methods currently in use.

Wind power

The former town of Seto erected eleven Mitsubishi MWT-1000 wind generators in January 2002. The Old Ikata installed two Vestas V52-850 kW generators in March 2005. Together they have an expected yearly energy output of 34,700 MWh.

Ikata is investing heavily in wind power infrastructure, with 45 additional towers currently under construction. The town plans to have a total of 60 generators within the next few years.

Nuclear power

Ikata is the site of Shikoku's only nuclear power plant. The Ikata Nuclear Power Plant has two Mitsubishi 538 MWe Pressurized Water Reactor units with the Two Reactor Coolant Loop design (similar to the original Westinghouse design at Prairie Island, Kewaunee, and Point Beach plants) and one Mitsubishi Pressurized Water Reactor unit with the Three Reactor Coolant Loop design (similar to the Westinghouse Surry, North Anna, and Robinson plants). Units 1 and 2 started up on September 30, 1977 and March 19, 1981 respectively. Unit 3 is a three loop PWR rated at 846 MWe that started up on December 15, 1994.

April 1, 2007, marked a milestone for the Ikata plant as it reached a total of 300 million kilowatt-hours of energy generated since beginning operations in 1977.

Education
Ikata has six public elementary schools and three public middle schools operated by the city government. The city has one public high school operated by the Ehime Prefectural Board of Education.

Transportation

Railways
Ikata has no passenger rail service. The closest station is the JR Shikoku Yawatahama Station on the Yosan Line.

Highways

Background
Due to Ikata's length and mountainous terrain, regular bus service did not reach the tip of the peninsula until the 1960s. Until then, the only public transportation available was local ferries that connected the bays of each neighborhood. In 1963, the original Japan National Route 197 was completed. It follows the coastline, and is thus extremely winding and narrow, with very little room for cars to pass. Traversing the peninsula by this route takes hours and can be quite nerve-wracking; this earned it the ire of the locals, who came up with a disparaging nickname that is a pun on the actual name: .

Modern day

The Ikata leg of the new National Route 197 was completed in 1987 and is the heart of transportation in modern Ikata, affectionately nicknamed "Melody Line". This nickname later spawned a musical road portion of the road built to celebrate its anniversary that was completed and added in 2011, so the road could literally have a "melody". The road "plays" parts of two Japanese songs when certain sections of the road are driven over. Unlike the old roads, Melody Line boasts two full lanes and runs relatively straight down the peninsula. Seated high in the mountains, drivers can enjoy views of both the Pacific Ocean and Inland Sea. The route terminates at Misaki and continues over to Kyūshū by ferries that connect Misaki Port with Saganoseki (Ōita, Ōita) and Beppu, Ōita.

Melody Line is such an improvement over the old roads that it has become a significant Ehime sightseeing attraction in itself, with many tourists coming to see cherry blossoms in the spring. Together with the city of Iyo's seaside Route 378, Melody Line makes one of the prefecture's recommended sightseeing routes, and one of JTB's .

Iyo Railway bus service runs up and down the peninsula, to and from Yawatahama, and offers express buses from Misaki to Matsuyama. However, commuter buses run infrequently and, due to the length of the peninsula and the scattered nature of the town's neighborhoods, bus travel remains more expensive and less convenient than in denser areas. Some tour buses also come across the strait from Kyūshū by ferry.

International exchange and sister cities

Relations with Ikata's only overseas sister city, Red Wing, Minnesota, USA, originally began as an exchange of technical knowledge and skills between engineers at the Ikata Nuclear Power Plant and Red Wing's Prairie Island plant. The two towns became official sister cities in August 1995.

Since then, Ikata has put much effort into expanding the horizons of its residents through English language education via the JET Programme, and an annual international student exchange with Red Wing. Beginning in 1995, Ikata middle school students have traveled almost yearly to Red Wing for home stays of one to two weeks, and students from Red Wing likewise come to Ikata to learn about life in rural Japan.

Ikata's high school, Misaki High School, maintains an exchange program with Australia.

Ikata has two sister cities, both of which also have nuclear power plants:
 Tomari, Hokkaidō, Japan, since February 1998
 Red Wing, Minnesota, United States, since August 1995

Local attractions

Sadamisaki Lighthouse
This lighthouse stands at the tip of the peninsula, overlooking the Hōyo Strait. On clear days you can see across to Kyūshū. Almost two kilometers of hiking trails and observation decks make up part of the Setonaikai National Park.

Seto Wind Hill Park
Located atop a mountain in the Gongen Mountain Park, Seto Wind Hill Park is located in the center of the peninsula and is free and open to the public. From it you can see dozens of Ikata's 29.5-meter, 4.3-ton windmills, and get up close to 11 of them. An actual wing of one of the windmills is on display in the park so visitors can get a better idea of the actual size. Benches and observation decks dot the park and Haikus about the windmills, submitted for Ikata's Windmill Festival, are on display year-round.

Public restrooms are available and powered by solar energy.

Ikata Visitors House
This hands-on science museum teaches all about nuclear power with beautiful interactive displays and fun activities for all ages. The building is connected to the Kirara-kan,

Kirara-kan
Opened in 1994, Kirara-kan houses an aquarium and sells souvenirs and local agricultural products. There are also several exhibits on display such as an Ikata Toji (Brew Master) exhibit and an International Relations exhibit with items on display from Ikata's sister city of Red Wing. Necklaces and pendants using pearls harvested from Uwa Sea to the south are also on sale. The second floor is a folk museum with scale-model fishing boat, and other tools and items of cultural significance to Ikata on display year-round. The third floor is a rest area offering a panorama view of the peninsula. Kirara-kan is connected to the Ikata Visitors House.

Red Wing Park
This park was constructed to commemorate the official joining of Ikata to her Sister City of Red Wing, Minnesota, after which it is named. Of note is the 21-meter stainless-steel monument located at the entrance of the park, a twin sister of the one in Bay Point Park, Red Wing. Beneath the monument lies a commemorative stone plaque bearing the signatures of each of the mayors at the time. It is home to Adventure Hill—a playground full of climbing nets, roller slides, and other children's play equipment. The park is free and open to the public. Tennis courts and a gravel field are available in the Community Grounds adjacent to the park. Reservations for use are made at the town office.

 Kamegaike Onsen
A hot spring bathing facility and park opened to the public in August 2007. Hot spring water is sourced from a well at a depth of 1,500 meters. The bath is divided into two large bathing areas "Misaki" and "Toji" that are male or female only. Which area is designated as male and which is designated as female switches weekly. The Onsen is wheelchair-friendly and offers bathing options to fit every need. A local-goods shop and a restaurant are located in the onsen. Overnight stays are not available. Public transportation is available daily. A bus stop is located directly in front of the entrance. Parking is free. According to legend, a giant crab lives in the adjacent Kamegaike Pond.

Roadside Stations
Ikata has two roadside stations along National Route 197. These are highway rest stops that offer refreshments, travel information, recreation facilities, and local goods for sale.

Ikata Kirara-kan
Features an aquarium, an exhibit chronicling Ikata's relations with its American sister city, Red Wing, Minnesota, and a small museum of Old Ikata historical artifacts. Attached to the Ikata Visitors House.

Seto Agriculture Park
Gelateria DanDan offers travelers unique ice cream and sorbet flavors like sake, kintarō potato, black sesame, and more. A Christmas tree decorated with mikan orange peels, a monument to Ikata explorer Hyōichi Kōno, and the Windmill Restaurant can also be found here.

Culture

Etymology of name
The origin of the name Ikata is unclear and there are several competing theories.
Ika can be found in the names of places surrounded by mountains or located in foothills; ta can mean "land".  Ikata could therefore be "a place by the mountains".
In the Ainu language, ika means "to pass through the mountains and cross the land". However, the Ainu are thought to have had little influence as far south as Shikoku.

Food
Ikata is known for its mikans and mikan juice. More than 20 different varieties of mikan are grown in Ikata. Old Ikata also has a very old sake brewing tradition that dates back to the Edo period, with several tōji brewmasters in the local area. There is even a museum dedicated to the Ikata Tōji.

The Seto area produces vegetables such as the bright-purple kintarō potato, and also catches baby sardines called .

Language
Residents of Ikata speak the Iyo dialect of Japanese, which is similar in many respects to the Hiroshima dialect. One feature particular to the Nanyo (southern Ehime) region is the use of the sentence-final particle ga (が) as a replacement for no (の) in some contexts. For example, Nani shiteru no? (何してるの？ "What are you doing?" in standard Japanese) becomes Nani shiyoru ga? (何しよるが？) in Iyo dialect.

Ikata's largest town celebration in late summer, the Kinahaiya Ikata Festival, is another example of the Iyo dialect—kinahai ya (来なはいや) literally means "come on over" (kinasai yo 来なさいよ in standard Japanese).

Festivals and events
Ikata has a wide variety of festivals and attractions the year around.

February

Misaki 
Men and women of  receive the blessings of local Buddhist priests in the form of a set of ceremonial dances. Afterwards, lucky decorative ornaments and free sake are offered to the crowd.
April

Held on Seto's Kōmo Highland atop Mt. Miharashi, the main event of this festival is an outdoor barbecue featuring locally-raised beef.
May
Seto 
Misaki 
June

July

August

This is Ikata's largest summer festival. Attractions include film and dance competitions, a taiko performance, children's sumo, and bare-handed fish catching, all concluded with a fireworks display in the evening.
Seto 
Local single women put on a wedding dress fashion show, followed by fireworks in the evening. An outdoor barbecue and bare-handed fish wrangling are held in the nearby Suka Park.
September
Ōku 
Every September a handful of local men and women gather along the Ōku beach to sing and perform this dance, with the purpose of placating the dead spirit of a woman who is said to have been washed ashore in Ōku long, long ago.
October

Each main region of Ikata holds its own separate Autumn Festival. Misaki's is perhaps the most spectacular of the three. Participants compete in repeatedly pulling the floats up along a giant 10-meter scaffold, then trying to drop theirs on top of the other.

3 important deities and demons make their appearance at most of Ikata's autumn festivals.

1. 
The tradition of the Ox Demon and festivals in Ikata dates back to the middle of Edo Japan (1800s).

2.
The Karashishi is most notably found in Japan at the entrance of Shinto Shrines and are used to either ward-off bad spirits or welcome good spirits. The Karashishi dance in Ikata involves two persons dancing under a single guardian lion costume to the beat of the drum of a young boy. Ikata's performers are especially well-known throughout most of the prefecture for their dedication to the dance.

3.
Although the origins of the five-deer dance are unknown, it is said that its traditions were brought over from Uwajima during the  period. (1624-1644) Especially popular at the time, many believe that it first made its appearance in Ikata at then Kawanagata-ura (川永田浦).

Folklore

The rats of Kuroshima

There are two small, uninhabited islands in the Uwa Sea near Yawatahama that belong to Ikata:  Kuroshima and Karasushima. A legend written in the 13th century text  tells the following story:

The giant crab of Kamegaike
Local legend tells of a giant crab, eight tatami mats in size, that lives in the Kamegaike Pond in Old Ikata's Futami neighborhood.

In popular culture
The Ikata Power Plant was referenced in the 1995 movie Godzilla vs. Destoroyah. Godzilla attempts to attack the power plant, but meets resistance from the Self Defense Force's "Super-X III" weapon.

Notable people from Ikata
Shūji Nakamura, 2014 Nobel Prize in Physics winner, inventor of the blue LED, hails from the former town of Seto.
Adventurer Hyōichi Kōno successfully reached the North Pole in 1997. He died in 2001 while attempting to walk from the North Pole back to his birthplace, the former town of Seto.
Nenten Tsubouchi is a haiku poet whose unique and quirky poems have been featured in elementary school textbooks in Japan.  He was born in the Kuchō neighborhood of Ikata.

Gallery

See also
Sadamisaki Peninsula
Ikata Nuclear Power Plant
Seto Wind Farm
Kuroshima, Ehime

References

External links

Ikata official website in English
Town of Ikata Sightseeing Map

Shikoku Denryoku Yonden Company official page in English

Towns in Ehime Prefecture
Populated coastal places in Japan
Ikata, Ehime